Trix Heberlein-Ruff (born 17 July 1942, in St. Gallen) is a Swiss politician of the Free Democratic Party (FDP) and a former president of the National Council of Switzerland.

Life and career 
Heberlein attended primary school in Teufen, later cantonal school in St. Gallen and earned her Matura in 1961. She subsequently studied law at the University of Zurich and earned a license degree in 1965. Later she took the lawyer exam.

Political career 
Heberlein was elected into the Cantonal Council of Zurich in 1979 which she was a part of until 1991. From 1991 to 2003, she was a member of the National Council which she chaired from November 1998 to December 1999. Then she represented the canton of Zurich in the Council of States from 2003 to 2007. On 20 December 2006, she announced she would retire by the end of her term. From 1998 to 2014, Heberlein chaired the foundation  that promotes organ donation.

Personal life 
Since 1967 she has been married to lawyer Robert Heberlin, with whom she has two daughters. She is a proficient skier and during her political career she organized several Ski races between Swiss parliamentarians, and interparliamenetarian races with members of the parliaments of either Austria or Great Britain. Her places of origin are Zumikon and Wattwil.

References

External links 
 

20th-century Swiss women politicians
20th-century Swiss politicians
21st-century Swiss women politicians
21st-century Swiss politicians
Free Democratic Party of Switzerland politicians
Presidents of the National Council (Switzerland)
Women members of the National Council (Switzerland)
Women members of the Council of States (Switzerland)
Swiss women lawyers
University of Zurich alumni
People from St. Gallen (city)
1942 births
Living people